This is a list of American college athletic stadiums and arenas. Conference alignments reflect those of the 2019–20 school year, except as noted otherwise.

College football
All conference affiliations and stadiums are current for the upcoming 2022 college football season.

Football Bowl Subdivision

American Athletic Conference
Cincinnati Bearcats – Nippert Stadium and Paycor Stadium
East Carolina Pirates – Dowdy–Ficklen Stadium
Houston Cougars – John O'Quinn Field at TDECU Stadium
Memphis Tigers – Simmons Bank Liberty Stadium
Navy Midshipmen – Navy–Marine Corps Memorial Stadium
SMU Mustangs – Gerald J. Ford Stadium
South Florida Bulls – Raymond James Stadium
Temple Owls – Lincoln Financial Field
Tulane Green Wave – Yulman Stadium
Tulsa Golden Hurricane – Skelly Field at H. A. Chapman Stadium
UCF Knights – FBC Mortgage Stadium

Atlantic Coast Conference

Atlantic Division
Boston College Eagles – Alumni Stadium
Clemson Tigers – Frank Howard Field at Clemson Memorial Stadium
Florida State Seminoles – Doak S. Campbell Stadium
Louisville Cardinals – Cardinal Stadium
North Carolina State Wolfpack – Wayne Day Family Field at Carter-Finley Stadium
Syracuse Orange – JMA Wireless Dome
Wake Forest Demon Deacons – Truist Field at Wake Forest

Coastal Division
Duke Blue Devils – Brooks Field at Wallace Wade Stadium
Georgia Tech Yellow Jackets – Bobby Dodd Stadium at Historic Grant Field
Miami Hurricanes – Hard Rock Stadium
North Carolina Tar Heels – Kenan Memorial Stadium
Pittsburgh Panthers – Heinz Field
Virginia Cavaliers – Scott Stadium
Virginia Tech Hokies – Lane Stadium

Big 12 Conference
Baylor Bears – McLane Stadium
Iowa State Cyclones – Jack Trice Stadium
Kansas Jayhawks – David Booth Kansas Memorial Stadium
Kansas State Wildcats – Bill Snyder Family Football Stadium
Oklahoma Sooners – Gaylord Family Oklahoma Memorial Stadium
Oklahoma State Cowboys – Boone Pickens Stadium
TCU Horned Frogs – Amon G. Carter Stadium
Texas Longhorns – Darrell K Royal Memorial Stadium
Texas Tech Red Raiders – Jones AT&T Stadium at Cody Campbell Field
West Virginia Mountaineers – Mountaineer Field at Milan Puskar Stadium

Big Ten Conference

East Division
Indiana Hoosiers – Memorial Stadium
Maryland Terrapins – Maryland Stadium
Michigan Wolverines – Michigan Stadium
Michigan State Spartans – Spartan Stadium
Ohio State Buckeyes – Ohio Stadium
Penn State Nittany Lions – Beaver Stadium
Rutgers Scarlet Knights – SHI Stadium

West Division
Illinois Fighting Illini – Memorial Stadium
Iowa Hawkeyes – Kinnick Stadium
Minnesota Golden Gophers – Huntington Bank Stadium
Nebraska Cornhuskers – Memorial Stadium
Northwestern Wildcats – Ryan Field
Purdue Boilermakers – Ross–Ade Stadium
Wisconsin Badgers – Camp Randall Stadium

Conference USA
Charlotte 49ers – Jerry Richardson Stadium
FIU Panthers – Riccardo Silva Stadium
Florida Atlantic Owls – FAU Stadium
Louisiana Tech Bulldogs – Joe Aillet Stadium
Middle Tennessee Blue Raiders – Johnny "Red" Floyd Stadium
North Texas Mean Green – Apogee Stadium
Rice Owls – Rice Stadium
UAB Blazers – Protective Stadium
UTEP Miners – Sun Bowl Stadium
UTSA Roadrunners – Alamodome
Western Kentucky Hilltoppers – Houchens Industries–L. T. Smith Stadium

Independents
Army Black Knights – Michie Stadium
BYU Cougars – LaVell Edwards Stadium
Liberty Flames – Williams Stadium
New Mexico State Aggies – Aggie Memorial Stadium
Notre Dame Fighting Irish – Notre Dame Stadium
UConn Huskies – Pratt & Whitney Stadium
UMass Minutemen – Warren McGuirk Alumni Stadium

Mid-American Conference

East Division
Akron Zips – InfoCision Stadium–Summa Field
Bowling Green Falcons – Doyt Perry Stadium
Buffalo Bulls – University at Buffalo Stadium
Kent State Golden Flashes – Dix Stadium
Miami RedHawks – Yager Stadium
Ohio Bobcats – Peden Stadium

West Division
Ball State Cardinals – Scheumann Stadium
Central Michigan Chippewas – Kelly/Shorts Stadium
Eastern Michigan Eagles – Rynearson Stadium
Northern Illinois Huskies – Huskie Stadium
Toledo Rockets – Glass Bowl
Western Michigan Broncos – Waldo Stadium

Mountain West Conference

Mountain Division
Air Force Falcons – Falcon Stadium
Boise State Broncos – Albertsons Stadium
Colorado State Rams – Canvas Stadium
New Mexico Lobos – Dreamstyle Stadium
Utah State Aggies – Romney Stadium
Wyoming Cowboys – War Memorial Stadium

West Division
Fresno State Bulldogs – Valley Children's Stadium
Hawaii Rainbow Warriors – Clarence T. C. Ching Athletics Complex (temporary stadium)
Nevada Wolf Pack – Mackay Stadium
San Diego State Aztecs – Snapdragon Stadium
San Jose State Spartans – CEFCU Stadium
UNLV Rebels – Allegiant Stadium

Pac-12 Conference
Arizona Wildcats – Arizona Stadium
Arizona State Sun Devils – Sun Devil Stadium
California Golden Bears – California Memorial Stadium
Colorado Buffaloes – Folsom Field
Oregon Ducks – Autzen Stadium
Oregon State Beavers – Reser Stadium
Stanford Cardinal – Stanford Stadium
UCLA Bruins – Rose Bowl
USC Trojans – Los Angeles Memorial Coliseum
Utah Utes – Rice–Eccles Stadium
Washington Huskies – Husky Stadium
Washington State Cougars – Martin Stadium

Southeastern Conference

East Division
Florida Gators – Ben Hill Griffin Stadium
Georgia Bulldogs – Sanford Stadium
Kentucky Wildcats – Kroger Field
Missouri Tigers – Faurot Field
South Carolina Gamecocks – Williams-Brice Stadium
Tennessee Volunteers – Neyland Stadium
Vanderbilt Commodores – Vanderbilt Stadium

West Division
Alabama Crimson Tide – Bryant–Denny Stadium
Arkansas Razorbacks – Donald W. Reynolds Razorback Stadium and War Memorial Stadium
Auburn Tigers – Jordan–Hare Stadium
LSU Tigers – Tiger Stadium
Ole Miss Rebels – Vaught–Hemingway Stadium
Mississippi State Bulldogs – Davis Wade Stadium
Texas A&M Aggies – Kyle Field

Sun Belt Conference

East Division 
Appalachian State Mountaineers – Kidd Brewer Stadium
Coastal Carolina Chanticleers – Brooks Stadium
James Madison Dukes – Bridgeforth Stadium and Zane Showker Field
Georgia Southern Eagles – Paulson Stadium
Georgia State Panthers – Center Parc Stadium
Marshall Thundering Herd – Joan C. Edwards Stadium
Old Dominion Monarchs – S. B. Ballard Stadium

West Division 
Arkansas State Red Wolves – Centennial Bank Stadium
Louisiana Ragin' Cajuns – Cajun Field
Louisiana–Monroe Warhawks – Malone Stadium
South Alabama Jaguars – Hancock Whitney Stadium
Southern Miss Golden Eagles – M. M. Roberts Stadium
Texas State Bobcats – Bobcat Stadium
Troy Trojans – Veterans Memorial Stadium

Football Championship Subdivision

ASUN Conference
 Austin Peay Governors – Fortera Stadium
 Central Arkansas Bears – Estes Stadium
 Eastern Kentucky Colonels – Roy Kidd Stadium
 Jacksonville State Gamecocks – JSU Stadium
 Kennesaw State Owls – Fifth Third Bank Stadium
 North Alabama Lions – Braly Municipal Stadium

Big Sky Conference
 Cal Poly Mustangs – Mustang Memorial Field
 Eastern Washington Eagles – Roos Field
 Idaho Vandals – Kibbie Dome
 Idaho State Bengals – Holt Arena
 Montana Grizzlies – Washington–Grizzly Stadium
 Montana State Bobcats – Bobcat Stadium
 Northern Arizona Lumberjacks – Walkup Skydome
 Northern Colorado Bears – Nottingham Field
 Portland State Vikings – Hillsboro Stadium
 Sacramento State Hornets – Hornet Stadium
 UC Davis Aggies – UC Davis Health Stadium
 Weber State Wildcats – Stewart Stadium

Big South Conference
 Bryant Bulldogs – Beirne Stadium
 Campbell Fighting Camels – Barker–Lane Stadium
 Charleston Southern Buccaneers – Buccaneer Field
 Gardner–Webb Runnin' Bulldogs – Ernest W. Spangler Stadium
 North Carolina A&T Aggies – Truist Stadium
 Robert Morris Colonials – Joe Walton Stadium

CAA Football
CAA Football is technically a separate entity from the all-sports Colonial Athletic Association, although both share the same administration.
 Albany Great Danes – Bob Ford Field
 Delaware Fightin' Blue Hens – Delaware Stadium
 Elon Phoenix – Rhodes Stadium
 Hampton Pirates – Armstrong Stadium
 Maine Black Bears – Alfond Stadium
 Monmouth Hawks – Kessler Field
 New Hampshire Wildcats – Wildcat Stadium
 Rhode Island Rams – Meade Stadium
 Richmond Spiders – E. Claiborne Robins Stadium
 Stony Brook Seawolves – Kenneth P. LaValle Stadium
 Towson Tigers – Johnny Unitas Stadium
 Villanova Wildcats – Villanova Stadium
 William & Mary Tribe – Zable Stadium

Ivy League
 Brown Bears – Brown Stadium
 Columbia Lions – Robert K. Kraft Field at Lawrence A. Wien Stadium
 Cornell Big Red – Schoellkopf Field
 Dartmouth Big Green – Memorial Field
 Harvard Crimson – Harvard Stadium
 Penn Quakers – Franklin Field
 Princeton Tigers – Princeton Stadium
 Yale Bulldogs – Yale Bowl

Mid-Eastern Athletic Conference
 Delaware State Hornets – Alumni Stadium
 Howard Bison – William H. Greene Stadium
 Morgan State Bears – Hughes Stadium
 Norfolk State Spartans – William "Dick" Price Stadium
 North Carolina Central Eagles – O'Kelly–Riddick Stadium
 South Carolina State Bulldogs – Oliver C. Dawson Stadium

Missouri Valley Football Conference
 Illinois State Redbirds – Hancock Stadium
 Indiana State Sycamores – Memorial Stadium
 Missouri State Bears – Plaster Sports Complex
 North Dakota Fighting Hawks – Alerus Center
 North Dakota State Bison – Fargodome
 Northern Iowa Panthers – UNI-Dome
 South Dakota Coyotes – DakotaDome
 South Dakota State Jackrabbits – Dana J. Dykhouse Stadium
 Southern Illinois Salukis – Saluki Stadium
 Western Illinois Leathernecks – Hanson Field
 Youngstown State Penguins – Stambaugh Stadium

Northeast Conference
 Central Connecticut Blue Devils – Arute Field
 Duquesne Dukes – Arthur J. Rooney Athletic Field
 LIU Sharks – Bethpage Federal Credit Union Stadium
 Merrimack Warriors – Duane Stadium
 Sacred Heart Pioneers – Campus Field
 Saint Francis Red Flash – DeGol Field
 Stonehill Skyhawks – W.B. Mason Stadium
 Wagner Seahawks – Wagner College Stadium

Ohio Valley Conference
 Eastern Illinois Panthers – O'Brien Stadium
 Lindenwood Lions – Harlen C. Hunter Stadium
 Murray State Racers – Roy Stewart Stadium
 Southeast Missouri Redhawks – Houck Stadium
 Tennessee State Tigers – Nissan Stadium and Hale Stadium
 Tennessee Tech Golden Eagles – Tucker Stadium
 UT Martin Skyhawks – Graham Stadium

Patriot League
 Bucknell Bison – Christy Mathewson–Memorial Stadium
 Colgate Raiders – Andy Kerr Stadium
 Fordham Rams – Coffey Field
 Georgetown Hoyas – Multi-Sport Field
 Holy Cross Crusaders – Fitton Field
 Lafayette Leopards – Fisher Field at Fisher Stadium
 Lehigh Mountain Hawks – Goodman Stadium

Pioneer Football League
 Butler Bulldogs – Bud and Jackie Sellick Bowl
 Davidson Wildcats – Richardson Stadium
 Dayton Flyers – Welcome Stadium
 Drake Bulldogs – Drake Stadium
 Marist Red Foxes – Leonidoff Field
 Morehead State Eagles – Jayne Stadium
 Presbyterian Blue Hose – Bailey Memorial Stadium
 St. Thomas Tommies – O'Shaughnessy Stadium
 San Diego Toreros – Torero Stadium
 Stetson Hatters – Spec Martin Memorial Stadium
 Valparaiso Beacons – Brown Field

Southern Conference
 Chattanooga Mocs – Finley Stadium
 The Citadel Bulldogs – Johnson Hagood Stadium
 East Tennessee State Buccaneers — William B. Greene Jr. Stadium
 Furman Paladins – Paladin Stadium
 Mercer Bears – Moye Complex
 Samford Bulldogs – Seibert Stadium
 VMI Keydets – Alumni Memorial Field
 Western Carolina Catamounts – E. J. Whitmire Stadium
 Wofford Terriers – Gibbs Stadium

Southland Conference
 Houston Baptist Huskies – HBU Stadium
 Incarnate Word Cardinals – Gayle and Tom Benson Stadium
 Lamar Cardinals – Provost Umphrey Stadium
 McNeese Cowboys – Cowboy Stadium
 Nicholls Colonels – Manning Field at John L. Guidry Stadium
 Northwestern State Demons – Harry Turpin Stadium
 Southeastern Louisiana Lions – Strawberry Stadium
 Texas A&M–Commerce Lions – Ernest Hawkins Field at Memorial Stadium

Southwestern Athletic Conference

East Division
 Alabama A&M Bulldogs – Louis Crews Stadium
 Alabama State Hornets – Hornet Stadium
 Bethune–Cookman Wildcats – Daytona Stadium
 Florida A&M Rattlers – Bragg Memorial Stadium
 Jackson State Tigers – Mississippi Veterans Memorial Stadium
 Mississippi Valley State Delta Devils – Rice–Totten Stadium

West Division
 Alcorn State Braves – Casem-Spinks Stadium
 Arkansas–Pine Bluff Golden Lions – Golden Lion Stadium
 Grambling State Tigers – Eddie Robinson Stadium
 Southern Jaguars – Ace W. Mumford Stadium
 Prairie View A&M Panthers – Panther Stadium at Blackshear Field
 Texas Southern Tigers – PNC Stadium

Western Athletic Conference
 Abilene Christian Wildcats – Anthony Field at Wildcat Stadium
 Sam Houston Bearkats – Bowers Stadium
 Southern Utah Thunderbirds – Eccles Coliseum
 Stephen F. Austin Lumberjacks – Homer Bryce Stadium
 Tarleton Texans – Memorial Stadium
 Utah Tech Trailblazers – Greater Zion Stadium